Khammam formally (Khammam Mettu) is the city in Khammam district of the Indian state of Telangana. It is the Third largest city in the state. It is the headquarters of the Khammam district and Khammam mandal also. The river Munneru flows on the western side of the city.  census of India, Khammam urban agglomeration has a population of 313,504. However, on 19 October 2012, the civic body of Khammam was upgraded to Municipal corporation Post upgradation to corporation Khammam population is approximated to be 3,07,000. Present population nearly 6,00,000 as on 31012023

Etymology 
Historical records show that the city's name was once "Kammamettu.". The name was also anglicized as "Comment" and "Khammammet".

History 

The name Khammam, which means a pillar is named after lord Narasimha Swamy, the presiding deity of Narasimhaswamy Gutta, an important pilgrimage site for the locals. Because of the presence of Lord Narasimhaswami temple in Khammam, the city was named Sthambadri earlier.  The city is located on the banks of a river called Munneru which is a tributary of the Krishna River. Khammam district has a lot of historical importance in Telangana.

Khammam City, which was the seat of the Taluk Administration, was part of the larger Warangal District, until 1 October 1953. Five taluks of the Warangal district viz., Khammam, Madhira, Yellandu, Burgampadu, and Paloncha (now Kothagudem) were carved out and a new district Khammam with Khammam as District Headquarters. In 1959 Bhadrachalam Revenue Division consisted of Bhadrachalam and Nuguru Venkatapuram Taluks of East Godawari district, which were on the other side of the river Godavari were merged into Khammam on grounds of geographical contiguity and administrative viability.

In 1973, a new taluk with Sathupalli as its headquarters was carved out from Madhira and Kothagudem taluks. In the year 1976 four new taluks were formed viz., Tirumalayapalem, Sudimalla, Aswaraopeta and Khammam district was initially a part of larger Warangal District.

History of Khammam shows that it has produced a number of leaders who were part of the Freedom struggle, such as first generation Communist leaders Peravelli Venkata Ramanaiah, Pendyala Satyanarayana Rao, Sarvadevabhatla Ramanatham, K.L. Narsimha Rao, and Chirravuri Laxminarasaiah First Municipal Chairman of Khammam; Congress leaders Madapati Hanumantha Rao, Chepuri Nenkanna, Madapati Ramchander Rao, Sardar Jamalpuram Keshava Rao, Bommakanti Satyanarayana Rao, Hayagreeva Chary, and Nizam Rashtra Vimochanam Jalagam Vengala Rao, former Chief Minister of AP, Prof. K. Venkata Ramiah, Founder and Vice-Chancellor of KU.

Freedom movement 

Some of the notable events in Khammam town during the freedom struggle:                                                  

1915: First Iron and steel store established by the then freedom fighter Sri.Thavidisetty Sambaiah to cater the needs of Telangana 

 1931 – First Independence movement in Khammam proper
 1935 – First Library established in Khammam town
 1945 – 12th State Andhra Mahasabha meeting at Khammam organized by Pendyala Satya Narayana Rao as general secretary, Aahvana sangham. Elected Baddam Ellareddy as president and Pendyala Satya Narayana Rao as vice-president to 13th State Andhra Mahasabha in that meeting. The meeting was held on 26–28 March. Puchalapalli Sundarayya participated in the meeting as a guest. Nearly 40,000 people attended the meeting.
 1946 – Mahathma Gandhi's visit to Khammam mett (Khammam town) on 5 August 1946
 1947 August, 7 – Satyagraham at Madhira and Khammam by Jamalapuram Kesava Rao, Kurapati Venkata Raju, Jagadeeswaraiah Neelakandan, Bachalakura Laxmaiah, Vattikonda Ramakotaiah, Heeralal Moriya, Teegala Hanumantha Rao, Kolipaka Kishan Rao, Gella Keshava Rao, Yadavalli Venkateswara Sharma, Pullabhotla Venkateswarlu (Hyderabad congress present), Vutukuru Kamala (Freedom Fighter – Telangana Vimochana)

Geography

Topography 
It has an average elevation of 108 metres (390 feet).

Climate 

Climate for Khammam
Average Weather in Khammam for January
Sunlight 	9 hours a day
Coldest January temperature	12 °C
Coldest daily temperature	16 °C
Warmest daily temperature	28 °C
Warmest January temperature	38 °C
Discomfort* 	Moderate
Morning Humidity 	76%
Evening Humidity 	45%
Rain in January 4  mm

Average Weather in Khammam for February
Sunlight 	10 hours a day
Coldest February temperature	15 °C
Coldest daily temperature	19 °C
Warmest daily temperature	29 °C
Warmest February temperature	40 °C
Discomfort* 	Moderate
Morning Humidity 	67%
Evening Humidity 	39%
Rain in February 9  mm
Wet days for February	1 days

Khammam experiences typical Indian climatic conditions. The summer season is hot and the temperatures can climb rapidly during the day. The monsoon season brings a certain amount of rainfall and the temperatures gradually reduce during this period. After the onset of the monsoon, day temperatures are much lower and as the winter approaches, they reduce further.

The summer season is from March and lasts till the end of May. During this time of day temperatures are high and can reach 40 °C to 48 °C. Humidity is low as it is not located near the ocean. Conditions are generally dry during this period and the temperatures range from a minimum of 35 °C and can rise up to a maximum of 40  °C to 45 °C. Monsoon season brings much needed relief from the heat. Monsoon seasons are from the months of June to September. Temperatures average around 30 °C during this period. The place gets rain from the South West Monsoon. Some amount of rainfall can be experienced in October as well. The Winter season is from December to February. January is usually the coldest part of the year. Temperatures range from 28 °C to 34 °C during this time.
 Winter: December To February
Summer: March to June
 South West Monsoons  July to September
 North East Monsoons  October to November

Rainstorms and cyclones are common in the region during the rainy season, which starts with the monsoons in early June. The cyclones could occur any time of the year, but commonly between August and November.

Floods 

Khammam has been receiving higher annual rainfall than the rest of the state. The annual rainfall is  during the monsoon season. Khammam was also affected by the floods of Munneru, the tributary of the Krishna River. In 2007, the floods struck by the River drowned the Bokkalagadda with heavy three-day rain. Again in 2009, floods struck and inundated the area. There has also been a proposal for the construction of a barricade. Food Corporation of India storage centers in Khammam regularly release food for the flood victims.

Demographics 

 census, population of Khammam (urban and rural areas combined) in 2011 is 313,504; of which male and female are 155,461 and 158,043 respectively—a sex ratio of 1017 females per 1000 males. Urban population of Khammam is 250,182 whereas, rural population of Khammam is 63,322. 32,172 children are in the age group of 0–6 years, of which 16,725 are boys and 15,447 are girls —a ratio of 924 per 1000. The average literacy rate stands at 79.40% (For ages 7 and above) with 223,380 literates, significantly higher than the state average of 67.41%.

Governance 

The Khammam Municipal Corporation is the city's civic body.

Khammam is one of Telangana's historical cities, with nearly 1,000 years of traceable history. It is the headquarters of the Khammam District. The town was constituted into a Municipality on 24 March 1942 and upgraded to a special grade municipality in the year 2001. Administratively, Khammam is divided into 11 revenue wards and 41 election wards. On 19 October 2012 Khammam municipality was announced as a Municipal Corporation, with a further 9 gram panchayats added around it which developed in business with the town. Presently Khammam has 20 revenue wards and 60 election divisions. The Municipal Corporation has an area of 93.45 km2.

Culture 
Bhakta Ramadasu Kala Kshetram, has been a prestigious National theatre, constructed by the State Government in the name of Sri. Bhakta Ramadasu ( Kancherla Gopanna ) was a devotee of Sri Rama and composer of Carnatic music.

Landmarks 

Khammam Fort, constructed in 950 AD by the Kakatiya Dynasty, is situated on a hill overlooking the city. Lakaram lake is another tourist attraction. Apart from these there are many places surrounding the city, such as Bhadrachalam, Parnasala, Nelakondapalli, Kusumanchi.

Information technology 

Minister for IT and Industries KT Rama Rao inaugurated IT Hub in Khammam city. Spread across 42,000 sq feet, the five-floor IT tower is constructed at a cost of Rs 27 crore. As many as 19 companies signed up to begin operations at the IT hub which provides employment opportunities to unemployed youth. The minister also said that the government will sanction Rs 20 crore soon for the phase II of IT Hub.

Transport 

The city is connected to major cities and towns by means of road and railways. National and state highways that pass through the city are National Highway 365A, State Highway 3, and 42. 
Khammam serves as a crucial link in connecting various cities in the region. It provides an alternative route from Hyderabad to the Godavari districts, bypassing the busy Vijayawada-Eluru route. Khammam also plays a significant role in connecting other important cities like Warangal and Rajahmundry.

Road 
Khammam Telangana State Road Transport Corporation bus station is the second biggest and highly sophisticated bus station in the Telangana state with modern facilities. City buses in the name of Khammam City Service run in various routes across the city and sub urban areas.

Railway 
Khammam railway station provides rail connectivity to the city, located on the Kazipet–Vijayawada section of the New Delhi-Chennai main line. It is administered under Secunderabad railway division of the South Central Railway zone. The station is served by Indian Railways and is well connected by rail to all parts of India. 98 trains arrive at or depart from the station every day, transporting over one lakh sixty thousand (160,000) passengers daily to their destinations across the country. Khammam railway station was declared second cleanest in the 'A' category stations.

Education 
There are various pharmacy colleges such as Khammam College of Pharmaceutical Sciences, Browns College of Pharmacy and MBA, MCA, and engineering colleges around Khammam, such as the Swarna Bharathi Institute of Science and Technology Engineering College, The Vazir Sultan College of Engineering. Mamata Medical College is also a teaching hospital located in the city. SR & BGNR Degree and KMDC Degree & PG College also conducts archaeological research on megalithic sites. For competitive exams like groups, police, and teacher jobs Right Choice IAS academy is the famous coaching center in the entire Khammam district. T

Media 

The major Telugu newspapers in city are Sakshi, Eenadu, Andhra Bhoomi, Andhra Prabha, Vaartha, Suryaa, Prajasakti, Nava telangana and Vishalandra. The major English newspapers in the city are The Hindu, Telangana Today, The Times of India, Deccan Chronicle, The Hindu Business Line, The New Indian Express and The Hans India. Electronic Media include HMTV, ETV, and Sakshi.

Sports 

 Sardar Patel Stadium – A stadium with all amenities including sports complex, indoor stadium, swimming pool, cricket net, skating rink, volleyball, basketball and tennis courts. There is a running track around the football pitch.

Festivals 

Women in the city celebrate Bathukamma, a floral festival in which they worship the goddess with different flowers for nine days. The women carry their Bathukamma to the nearest temple of their locality, then they clap, sing and dance rhythmically around the Bathukamma. Along with Bathukamma, Bonalu was also declared a state festival on 15 June 2014.

Cuisine 

The cuisine of the city is mainly South Indian. The famous breakfast items are idli, dosa, vada, Rava Bonda, Mysore Bonda, Parotha and Puri. Rice with variety of curries including curd is taken as main food and the most notable one is the Biryani. Special food items Harees and Haleem are traditional food items available in the season of Ramadan.

Notable people 
 

N. V. Raghuram (born 1948), Indian yoga guru

References

External links 

 Official website of Khammam District.

 
Khammam district
Khammam task force articles
Cities in Telangana
Municipalities of Telangana
District headquarters of Telangana